Nikola Kojo (born 5 September 1967) is a Serbian actor and film director as well the TV Host of the game shows The Weakest Link.

Biography

Nikola was named after his great-grandfather, who was an protoiereus in Mostar. He made his acting debut before he turned 13, with the role of the boy Ivan in the 1980 film "Rad na određeno vreme". During the 1980s, he played notable roles in the film "Igmanski marš" (1983), the TV series Sivi Dom (1986), and one of the main roles in three sequels  of the very popular film series Foolish Years, which profiled him as one of the most famous actors of the younger generation in the former Yugoslavia.

In 1992, he played the main role in Srđan Dragojević's film Mi nismo anđeli (We're Not Angels), for which he remains notable. He starred again in the 2005 sequel Mi nismo anđeli 2.

He is married to Aleksandra Đurić, with whom he has a daughter Ana (2008) and two twin daughters (2013).

He made his directing debut in the film Herd (2016).

During the 2022 Serbian general election Kojo supported opposition candidates Zdravko Ponoš, Marinika Tepić and 
Dobrica Veselinović.

Selected filmography

Film

Television

References

External links
 

1967 births
Living people
Male actors from Belgrade
Serbian male actors
Serbian male child actors